This glossary of artificial intelligence is a list of definitions of terms and concepts relevant to the study of artificial intelligence, its sub-disciplines, and related fields. Related glossaries include Glossary of computer science, Glossary of robotics, and Glossary of machine vision.

A

B

C

D

E

F

G

H

I

J

K

L

M

N

O

P

Q

R

S

T

U

V

W

See also
 Artificial intelligence

References

Notes

Artificial intelligence
Machine learning
Artificial intelligence
Wikipedia glossaries using description lists